Video Trek 88 is a computer game developed and published by Windmill Software in 1982, based on the earlier Star Trek text game. As opposed to the mainframe version, both the galactic chart and the local map are displayed side by side.

The game is suitable for monochrome or color adapters, but is best viewed in monochrome. It was one of Windmill Software's earliest games, written in the BASIC programming language (specifically, BASICA) and requires an interpreter such as GW-BASIC to be executed.

References

External links
Video Trek 88 on Home of the Underdogs
Video Trek 88 entry at Back to BASICs

1982 video games
DOS games
DOS-only games
Video games based on Star Trek: The Original Series
Unofficial works based on Star Trek
Starship simulators based on Star Trek
Video games with textual graphics
Windmill Software games
Commercial video games with freely available source code
Video games developed in Canada
Single-player video games